Davide Viscardi (born 21 December 1990 in Milan) is an Italian male short track speed skater.

References

External links
Davide Viscardi's profile , from http://www.sochi2014.com ; retrieved 2014-06-14.

1990 births
Living people
Italian male short track speed skaters
Olympic short track speed skaters of Italy
Short track speed skaters at the 2014 Winter Olympics
Sportspeople from Milan